Stan Webb may refer to:

Stan Webb (footballer, born 1906) (1906–1994), English footballer
Stan Webb (footballer, born 1947), English footballer
Stan Webb (guitarist) (born 1946), English guitarist
Stan Webb (rugby league) (1899–1971), New Zealand rugby league footballer